Kadma may refer to one of a number of articles:
 Kadma (Jamshedpur),  a neighbourhood in Jamshedpur, Jharkhand, India
Kadma (trope), Torah cantillation mark
Kadma, Khunti, a village in Jharkhand, India
Kadma, Hazaribagh, a census town in Jharkhand, India